Macha (Maaça) is a rural locality (a selo), the only inhabited locality, and the administrative center of Machinsky Rural Okrug of Olyokminsky District in the Sakha Republic, Russia. Its population as of the 2010 Census was 1,089, of whom 560 were male and 529 female, up from 403 as recorded during the 2002 Census.

Geography 
Macha is located at the southwestern end of Yakutia,  from Olyokminsk, the administrative center of the district. It lies on the left bank of the Lena River, downstream from the confluence of the Bolshoy Patom River.

References

Notes

Sources
Official website of the Sakha Republic. Registry of the Administrative-Territorial Divisions of the Sakha Republic. Olyokminsky District. 

Rural localities in Olyokminsky District